Bythinella padiraci is a species of very small freshwater snail, an aquatic gastropod mollusk in the family Amnicolidae. This snail is endemic to France, from a very little place named "Gouffre de Padirac" (Padirac give his name to the snail).

References

Bythinella
Gastropods described in 1902
Taxonomy articles created by Polbot